Nuestra Belleza Chiapas 2012 was held in Tuxtla Gutiérrez, Chiapas, on July 26, 2012. At the conclusion of the final night of competition, Karla Franyutti of Las Rosas was crowned the winner by outgoing Nuestra Belleza Chiapas titleholder Krystell Padilla. Six contestants competed for the crown.

Results

Placements

Background music
 Trovarocker
 Juan Solo

Contestants

Notes
These contestants withdrew from the contest for unknown reasons:

References

External links
 

Nuestra Belleza México